Michel Morganella (born 17 May 1989) is a Swiss professional footballer who plays as a defender for Chiasso.

Club career
Born to an Italian father and a Swiss mother, Morganella is a product of the FC Basel youth system and plays as a right-back or a wide-right midfielder. He first came into the Basel team at the end of the 2006–07 season, playing in three games that campaign. In the 2007–08 campaign he was given the #4 jersey, later starting to be featured on the first team.

Morganella then signed a new three-year contract at Basel, with the club moving quickly to freshen up his expiring deal. This deal was intended to keep him at St. Jakob-Park until 2011.

However, on 30 January 2009, following days of speculation about his future, Palermo officially announced to have signed Morganella from FC Basel on a four-year and a half contract, He thus became the first Swiss footballer to play for the rosanero.

During his early times at Palermo, Morganella never broke into the first team and he was eventually loaned out to Serie B club Novara in July 2010.

On 31 January 2011, Palermo announced to have sold 50% of Morganella's transfer rights to Novara along with Samir Ujkani (both tagged for €1.5 million), as part of a bid involving striker Pablo Andrés González for €5 million. He concluded the season with a historic promotion to Serie A.

On 22 June 2012, Palermo announced on their website that they had re-acquired the full transfer rights of Morganella and fellow Novara player Ujkani.

On 26 October 2018, he returned to Switzerland, signing a two-year contract with Rapperswil-Jona. Coming back at the competition, he played 7 games before the end of 2018.

On 15 January 2019, Morganella signed with Italian Serie B club Padova.

On 10 July 2019, he signed with Livorno.

International career
Morganella debuted with the senior Swiss national football team on 30 May 2012, replacing Reto Ziegler in the friendly against Romania.

He was chosen by Pierluigi Tami for the London 2012 Olympics national squad.

On 30 July 2012, following the Swiss team's defeat to South Korea, the Swiss Olympic Committee expelled Morganella from the games after he posted on Twitter a message translating to "I am going to batter the Koreans, burn them all... bunch of Mongoloids." Morganella later apologized.

Honours
Basel
 Swiss Champion at U-18 level: 2005–06
 Swiss Cup Winner at U-19/U-18 level: 2005–06

References

External links
 Profile at FC Basel 
 Profile at Swiss Football League 
 
 

1989 births
Living people
People from Sierre
Swiss men's footballers
Swiss expatriate footballers
Swiss expatriate sportspeople in Italy
FC Sion players
FC Basel players
Palermo F.C. players
Novara F.C. players
FC Rapperswil-Jona players
Calcio Padova players
U.S. Livorno 1915 players
FC Chiasso players
Swiss Super League players
Serie A players
Serie B players
Swiss Challenge League players
Swiss Promotion League players
Expatriate footballers in Italy
Association football defenders
Switzerland youth international footballers
Switzerland international footballers
Switzerland under-21 international footballers
Footballers at the 2012 Summer Olympics
Anti-South Korean sentiment
Olympic footballers of Switzerland
Swiss people of Italian descent
Sportspeople from Valais